Cirsonella romettensis is a species of sea snail, a marine gastropod mollusk in the family Skeneidae.

Description
The size of the shell varies between 1.1 mm and 2.6 mm.

Distribution
This species occurs in the Mediterranean Sea and in European waters

References

 Granata-Grillo G., 1877, Descriptions de quelques espèces nouvelles ou peu connues; Napoli, Salvatore Marchese 16 p.
 Gofas, S.; Le Renard, J.; Bouchet, P. (2001). Mollusca, in: Costello, M.J. et al. (Ed.) (2001). European register of marine species: a check-list of the marine species in Europe and a bibliography of guides to their identification. Collection Patrimoines Naturels, 50: pp. 180–213

External links
  Serge GOFAS, Ángel A. LUQUE, Joan Daniel OLIVER,José TEMPLADO & Alberto SERRA (2021) - The Mollusca of Galicia Bank (NE Atlantic Ocean); European Journal of Taxonomy 785: 1–114
CLEMAM: Cirsonella romettenis
 

romettensis
Gastropods described in 1877